Cathedral of the Blessed Virgin Mary might refer to:

 Cathedral of the Blessed Virgin Mary, Bogor, Indonesia
 Cathedral of the Blessed Virgin Mary, Hamilton, New Zealand
 Cathedral of the Blessed Virgin Mary, Lincoln, England
 Cathedral of the Blessed Virgin Mary, Minsk, Belarus
 Cathedral of the Blessed Virgin Mary, Odessa, Ukraine
 Cathedral of the Blessed Virgin Mary, Płock, Poland
 Cathedral of the Blessed Virgin Mary, Salisbury, England
 Cathedral of the Blessed Virgin Mary, Truro, England
 Cathedral of the Blessed Virgin Mary, Vilkaviškis, Lithuania